Saint Irenaeus of Sirmium (died 304 AD) was an Illyrian bishop of Sirmium in Pannonia, which is now Sremska Mitrovica, Serbia. He was bishop during the reign of Diocletian. He refused to offer pagan sacrifices, even at the behest of his family. He was condemned by the governor of Pannonia, and then beheaded on 24 March 304.

External links
https://web.archive.org/web/20070205223359/http://www.catholic-forum.com/saints/sainti66.htm
 See pages 78ff in "Victories of the Martyrs" by St. Alphonsus de Liguori

References

Walsh, Michael, ed. Butler's Lives of the Saints.

3rd-century births
304 deaths
Illyrian people
4th-century Christian martyrs
3rd-century bishops in Pannonia
People from Sirmium
4th-century bishops in Pannonia